Hellinsia siskaellus is a moth of the family Pterophoridae that is found in Argentina (Rio Negro) and Chile.

The wingspan is 21‑23 mm. The forewings are pale brown and the markings dark brown. The hindwings and fringes are grey‑brown. Adults are on wing in October and from December to January.

References

siskaellus
Moths described in 1991
Moths of South America